Villa Celiera is a comune and town in the province of Pescara in the Abruzzo region of Italy. It is located in the  Gran Sasso e Monti della Laga National Park. The economy is based on agriculture (potatoes, cereals) and animal husbandry. The town mayor is Domenico Vespa. 
The town is famous for having created arrosticini, a lamb kabob that has become a favorite throughout Italy. The most famous butchery that creates the arrosticini in Villa Celiera is macelleria Ginestra.

The town borders the Abruzzo National Park.
 
A few expatriates return from other countries in the summer - mainly South Africans. The main ethnic groups are Italian with minor Romanian immigrants that have come within the 2000-2013 era. The natives speak a local dialect called Cellarotto.
 
The town is well known for its famous restaurants, including the famous Celentano - whose owner is now deceased, and IL Fungarolo.
 
Winter attractions include skiing and sledding. Summer attractions include hiking, mushroom finding and hunting.
 
WORLD WAR TWO
 
The town is famous for its famous resistance against partisan soldiers after Mussolini was captured an hour away in Campo Imperatore. The town has always had a strong discipline of woodsman training regime, called the Alpine Guard, that were used by the Kingdom of Italy as shock troops in multiple wars including the Italian conquest of Libya and the first and second wars of Ethiopia.
 
At 6:00 A. M., of October 30, 1944, 5,000 communist partisans ascended into the town from the nearby town of Vestea to subdue local pro-fascist movements. The ragtag group of fascists, outnumbered 3 to 1, led by the now deceased Amadeo Inzaghi, fought the communist on the Mount of Bertona. The fascists troops defeated the disorganized partisans. Although, the skirmish was insignificant in the history books and reported only by local pro fascist newspapers, the inhabitants of the town still retain the sense of pride from the battle.

References

Cities and towns in Abruzzo